The Ian Potter Museum of Art at the University of Melbourne in Melbourne, Australia was established in 1972. It houses the art collection of the University of Melbourne. Current director, Kelly Gellatly, was appointed in 2013. It is not to be confused with the Ian Potter Centre, another art gallery in Melbourne, run by the National Gallery of Victoria.

The Potter, as it is known locally, presents a curated exhibition program of historical and contemporary art. Through its activities the Potter provides for the acquisition, maintenance, conservation, cataloguing, exhibition, investigation, interpretation and promotion of the extensive art collections of the University of Melbourne.

The current building opened in 1998 and was designed by the architect Nonda Katsalidis of Katsalidis Architects. The architect project team included Bill Krotiris, Adrian Amore, Lisette Agius, Donna Brzezinski, Keiran Boyle, Kei Lu Cheong, Luisa Di Gregorio, Holger Frese, Chris Godsell, Robert Kolak, Barbara Moje, Rainer Strunz, Marius Vogl, Jackie Wagner.

References

External links 
 
 Architecture AU Archive
 Research and Publications on the Ian Potter Museum of Art collection

Art museums established in 1998
Art museums and galleries in Melbourne
Archaeological museums in Australia
University museums in Australia
Contemporary art galleries in Australia
University of Melbourne
Buildings and structures in the City of Melbourne (LGA)